Enathu Bailey bridge was a Bailey bridge constructed by Indian Army through Kallada River in Enathu, Pathanamthitta, Kerala. It connects Enathu with Kottarakkara. The bridge is opened for public at 10 April 2017. The bridge is 54.50-metre-long with a width of 3.5 metres.

In September 2017, after the Enathu Bridge maintenance completed, the Indian Army dismantle the Bailey bridge.

References

Buildings and structures in Pathanamthitta district
Bridges in Kerala
Transport in Pathanamthitta district